Resident Return, also known as Resident Is Back, is a 1982 Soviet thriller film directed by Venyamin Dorman.

It is the third of four films based around the same character, the spy Mikhail Tulyev, played by Georgy Zhzhyonov. The first one, The Secret Agent's Blunder (Resident's Mistake) was made in 1968, with Secret Agent's Destiny (Resident's Way) following in 1970.  (Konets operatsii Rezident) was released in 1986.

Plot 
The film is a continuation of the films “The Secret Agent's Blunder” and Secret Agent's Destiny. Mikhail Tulyev prevented the sabotage action of Western intelligence agencies.

Cast 
 Georgiy Zhzhonov as Mikhail Tulyev
 Pyotr Velyaminov as Lukin
 Leonid Bronevoy as Staube
 Boris Khimichev as Robert Stivenson
 Iren Azer as Marta
 Yevgeny Kindinov as Brockman
 Vadim Zakharchenko as Utkin
 Nikolai Prokopovich as Markov
 Lyubov Sokolova as Natalya Sergeyevna
 Nikolay Grabbe as Krug

References

External links 
 

1982 films
1980s Russian-language films
Soviet thriller films
1982 thriller films